Hume Parris (born 22 February 1940) is a Jamaican cricketer. He played in three first-class matches for the Jamaican cricket team from 1961 to 1964.

See also
 List of Jamaican representative cricketers

References

External links
 

1940 births
Living people
Jamaican cricketers
Jamaica cricketers
People from Saint Ann Parish